Nyssa may refer to:

People
 Gregory of Nyssa (335–395), 4th-century Christian bishop, theologian, and saint
 Nyssa (Doctor Who), a fictional character in Doctor Who
 Nyssa Raatko, a Batman super villainess

Places
 Nyssa (Alexander), a town spared by Alexander the Great in his invasion of Central Asia
 Nyssa (Cappadocia), a Roman city and bishopric
 Nyssa (Caria), a Hellenistic city, Asian Turkey
 Nyssa (Lycia), an ancient city, Asian Turkey
 Nyssa, Oregon, a city in the United States

Other
 Nyssa (plant), the genus name for tupelo trees
 New York State Snowmobile Association
 New York State Sociological Association

See also 
 Neisse (disambiguation)
 Nisa (disambiguation)
 Nissa (disambiguation)
 Nisse (disambiguation)
 Nysa (disambiguation)